Taeniostolella is a monotypic moth genus in the sedge moth family (Glyphipterigidae). The genus was described by Thomas Bainbrigge Fletcher in 1940. Its only species, Taeniostolella celophora, was described by Edward Meyrick in 1920, and it is found in Brazil.

References

Moths described in 1920
Glyphipterigidae
Monotypic moth genera